Ronny Kockel (born 16 December 1975) is a German former professional footballer who played as a goalkeeper.

Playing career 
Kockel was born in Räckelwitz. On 2 January 2008, he signed for Iran Pro League side Paykan F.C. on a six-month contract, becoming the first German professional footballer in Iran.

Post-playing career 
On 3 December 2009, Kockel worked in the marketing department of his club KFC Uerdingen. On 26 May 2012, he was named the successor of Jörg Jung as head coach alongside Erhan Albayrak.

References

External links 
 

1975 births
Living people
People from Bautzen (district)
People from Bezirk Dresden
German footballers
Footballers from Saxony
Association football goalkeepers
Paykan F.C. players
Arminia Bielefeld players
SV Sandhausen players
Stuttgarter Kickers players
SV Eintracht Trier 05 players
KFC Uerdingen 05 players
VfR Mannheim players
Olympiakos Nicosia players
Cypriot First Division players
German football managers
KFC Uerdingen 05 managers
German expatriate footballers
German expatriate sportspeople in Iran
Expatriate footballers in Iran
German expatriate sportspeople in Cyprus
Expatriate footballers in Cyprus